Kampmann is a surname. Notable people with the surname include:

Christian Kampmann (1939–1988), Danish author and journalist
Hack Kampmann (1856–1920), Danish architect
Martin Kampmann (born 1982), Danish mixed martial artist
Mel Kampmann, hired as News Director at WFIL-TV (Channel 6) in Philadelphia in 1969
Steven Kampmann (born 1947), American actor, writer, and director
Viggo Kampmann (1910–1976), the leader of the Danish Social Democrats and Prime Minister of Denmark 1960–1962

See also
Kampman